South Wharf is an inner-city suburb in Melbourne, Victoria, Australia, 2 km south-west of Melbourne's Central Business District, located within the City of Melbourne local government area. South Wharf recorded a population of 71 at the 2021 census.

South Wharf is a small inner suburb south west from Melbourne's CBD. Its borders are the Yarra River to the north, Wurundjeri Way to the west, the West Gate Freeway and a small private car park bordering Ford Street and Munro Street, which is part of the City of Port Phillip, to the south and the former Port Melbourne railway line and Clarendon Street to the east.

Gazetted in 2008 and formerly part of the industrial and shipping area of Southbank, the renaming is part of a wider urban renewal strategy to link Southbank with the Melbourne Docklands.

South Wharf includes some of Melbourne's landmarks, including the Melbourne Convention & Exhibition Centre and the Melbourne Maritime Museum, with its heritage Polly Woodside.

South Wharf is also home to many apartments, shopping outlet DFO South Wharf and the 5-star luxury hotel Pan Pacific Hotel.

A five-storey Victorian warehouse, known as the Tea House (at 28 Clarendon Street), built in 1888, is one of the few buildings which survived the redevelopment of the area.

References

External links

 DFO South Wharf website
 South Wharf Association

Suburbs of Melbourne
Suburbs of the City of Port Phillip
Suburbs of the City of Melbourne (LGA)
Port of Melbourne